Vivien Víg (born 27 February 1991 in Pécs) is a Hungarian team handball goalkeeper who plays for Kozármisleny. She was member of the Hungarian team, which finished second on the Junior European Championship in 2009. In addition, thanks to her outstanding performances, she was voted the best goalkeeper of the tournament.

Achievements
Nemzeti Bajnokság I:
Winner: 2010
Magyar Kupa:
Winner: 2010
EHF Champions League:
Semifinalist: 2010
Junior European Championship:
Silver Medalist: 2009

Awards and recognition
 All-Star Goalkeeper of the Junior European Championship: 2009

References

1991 births
Living people
Sportspeople from Pécs
Hungarian female handball players
Győri Audi ETO KC players